Pîrlița is a commune in Ungheni District, Moldova. It is composed of two villages, Hristoforovca and Pîrlița.

Notable people
 Mihai Godea
 Maxim Canișev

References

Communes of Ungheni District